The men's 100 metres event at the 1967 Pan American Games was held in Winnipeg on 29 and 30 July.

Medalists

Results

Heats
Held on 29 July

Wind:Heat 1: +1.0 m/s, Heat 2: +1.0 m/s, Heat 3: +1.6 m/s, Heat 4: +1.4 m/s

Semifinals
Held on 29 July

Wind:Heat 1: +0.9 m/s, Heat 2: +1.6 m/s

Final
Held on 30 July

Wind: +3.1 m/s

References

Athletics at the 1967 Pan American Games
1967